The 1970 Limerick Senior Hurling Championship was the 76th staging of the Limerick Senior Hurling Championship since its establishment by the Limerick County Board.

Patrickswell were the defending champions.

On 4 October 1970, Patrickswell won the championship after a 2-14 to 0-02 defeat of Kilmallock in the final. It was their fourth championship title overall and their second title in succession.

Results

Final

References

Limerick Senior Hurling Championship
Limerick Senior Hurling Championship